Josh Eric Eppard (born December 6, 1979) is an American musician from Kingston, New York and the drummer for progressive rock band Coheed and Cambria. He has worked as a solo rapper under the name Weerd Science and was the drummer for supergroup rock band Terrible Things. Josh was a founding member of the Woodstock, NY new prog outfit 3 along with his brother Joey and studio engineer Chris Bittner.

On November 2, 2006 it was announced that Josh would be leaving Coheed and Cambria indefinitely, with Chris Pennie as his replacement. The reason for his abrupt departure from the band had been shrouded in mystery. However, in an interview with Michael Dodd of Get Your Rock Out, Josh laid the rumours to rest. Though there was speculation Josh had left the band due to "creative limitations", his split from the band actually resulted from a bout with drug addiction that had been exacerbated by the frantic touring schedule, among other things. Citing an often asked question of him as to whether he quit the band or was fired, Josh's response was that he was likely "about to be fired" before he left.

After leaving Coheed and Cambria, Josh recorded his second Weerd Science album, Sick Kids, at Darkworld Studio in Kingston, NY and Applehead Studios in Woodstock, NY. The album is a creative look into the drug addiction the artist suffered, offering, in addition to a very trying personal account, an insightful social commentary on the current condition of the United States. More recently, he also formed a new rock band, Mours, with friend and collaborator Dave Parker and musician Anthony Masington.

In 2009, Josh began drumming in Terrible Things, a band he formed with fellow musicians Fred Mascherino, Andy Jackson, and bassist Steve Lucarelli, who has since left the band. They have been touring and released their debut, Terrible Things on Universal Motown on August 31, 2010. In 2011, Josh signed with Horris Records.

On November 16, 2011, Coheed and Cambria revealed on their website that Josh had officially rejoined the band. On the Terrible Things YouTube channel, Terrible Things vocalist Fred Mascherino announced that Josh had left Terrible Things.

Discography

As Weerd Science

Studio albums
 Friends and Nervous Breakdowns (2005)
 Sick Kids (2011)

Extended plays
 From the Grave (2006, Internet release)
 Red Light Juliet (2013, Internet release)
 Red Light Juliet Broadcast 2: Steady Straight Lights/Sudden Dark Turns (2014, Internet release)
 Red Light Juliet Broadcast 3: The Seer (2015, Internet release)

Mixtapes
 Unreleased 2000–2004 (2009)
 "Weekend at Dirty's" (2011)

Collaborations
 Newborn (1999, under the group name Newborn with Bobby Delicious)
 Leader 0ne (2001, under the group name Leader 0ne with Majestic)
 "Bedroom Emcees" (2009, with Mazeman)
 "Everywhere That We Go" (2010, with Rick Whispers)
 "Tech Echoes" (2010, with Mazeman and Ant Mas)
 "How to Be an Indie Rapper" (2011, with MC Lars)

With 3
 Paint by Number (1999)

With Coheed and Cambria
 The Second Stage Turbine Blade (2002)
 In Keeping Secrets of Silent Earth: 3 (2003)
 Good Apollo, I'm Burning Star IV, Volume One: From Fear Through the Eyes of Madness (2005)
 The Afterman: Ascension (2012)
 The Afterman: Descension (2013)
 The Color Before the Sun (2015)
Vaxis – Act I: The Unheavenly Creatures (2018)
Vaxis – Act II: A Window of the Waking Mind (2022)

With Fire Deuce
 Children of the Deuce – Drums, as Deuce Newton

With Terrible Things
 Terrible Things (2010)

Drumming
Eppard plays the drum set in the open-handed style.
He uses a single bass drum pedal, which he insists gives a better groove.

Gear

 Drums: 

Tama Drums

 Starclassic Performer B/B
 Shell Color: Champagne Sparkle (CHS)
 16"x22" Bass Drum
 8"x12" Tom Tom
 16"x16" Floor Tom
 5.5"x14" SLP Dynamic Bronze Snare (LBZ1455)
 5.5"x14" Vintage Poplar Maple Snare (LMPM1455FNFM)

Hardware

 Iron Cobra Power Glide Single Pedal (HP900PN)
 Iron Cobra Lever Glide HH Stand (HH905N)
 Roadpro Cymbal & Snare Stands (HC83BW & HS800W)
 STAR Single Tom Stand (HTS108W)
 1st Chair Ergo-Rider Throne (HT730B)

 Cymbals (Sabian) 

Josh stated in a recent interview that he usually picks cymbals that he feels "fit the live set list". He also stated that he "like[s] to go between a Sabian 20″ HHX Stage ride, a 20″ HHX Stage crash, 14″ hi-hats, and a 18″ to 20″ China. I love the 19″ Paragon and the 18″ AAX China.".

 Sticks 
 Pro Mark Natural 5B (wood tip) with Pro Mark blue stick rapp

 Heads 
 Snare Evans Hybrid Coated Batter Head 14 in.
 Toms Evans EC2S Clear Batter Drumheads 12 in and 16 in
 Bass EMAD Clear 22 in, Custom Tama Reso Head

 Microphones (Live) 
 Shure SM57 (Snare)
 Sennheiser 604 (Toms)
 Shure 52 and 91 (Bass)
 Neumann KM184 (Overheads)

Previous Used Set up:

C&C Custom Drums

Red Sparkle Kit
 6.5" x 14" Snare
 8" x 10" Rack Tom (sometimes a 9" x 12" Rack Tom)
 15" x 15" floor Tom
 18" x 22" Bass Drum

 Hardware 
 All DW 9000 series Boom Stands, Hi-Hat Stands, Tom Stands, Pedals and Throne.

 Cymbals (Sabian) 
 13" AA Hi-Hats
 18" AA Chinese
  8" AA Splash
 21" AA Raw Bell Dry Ride (used as crash)
 21" AA Rock Ride

In earlier days, Josh has used Zildjian, Paiste and a number of other cymbal brands.

 Heads 
 Snare (Remo Coated Emperor)
 Toms (Pinstripes on tops, and Clear Ambassadors on bottoms)
 Bass (Remo Powerstroke 3 with C&C Custom Logo Head on front)

References

External links
Mours Myspace profile
Weerd Science purevolume profile
Weerd Science MySpace profile
Weerd Science fan site
Terrible Things Myspace profile
Interview with Weerd Science

1979 births
American rock drummers
Coheed and Cambria members
Equal Vision Records artists
Living people
Rappers from New York (state)
Musicians from Kingston, New York
20th-century American drummers
American male drummers
21st-century American rappers
21st-century American drummers